The MSCI KLD 400 Social Index was launched in 1990 and is designed to help socially conscious investors weigh social and environmental factors in their investment choices.
It was founded by KLD's Amy Domini as the Domini 400 Social Index.

The MSCI KLD 400 Social Index is designed to provide exposure to the common stocks of companies that KLD determines have positive environmental, social and corporate governance (ESG) characteristics. The KLD400 consists of 400 companies drawn from the universe of the 3,000 largest U.S. public equities as measured by float-adjusted market capitalization. The index is composed approximately 90% of large cap companies, 9% mid cap companies chosen for sector diversification, and 1% small cap companies with exemplary social and environmental records.

The eligible universe for the KLD400 is the 3,000 largest U.S. companies (by float-adjusted market capitalization) in the U.S. equity market.  KLD selects the eligible universe index on April 15 (or closest business day) of each year.

KLD defines U.S. equity as follows:
 U.S. headquarters
 Primary market listing is the NYSE or NASDAQ
 Companies with non-U.S. incorporation for tax or regulatory purposes are evaluated on a case-by-case basis

KLD follows the rules of the FTSE AWD USA Index.

The following types of equities are not eligible for the KLD400: 
 Preferred stocks 
 Limited or other types of partnerships 
 Royalty trusts 
 Closed-end funds

In 2010, it was renamed from FTSE KLD 400 Social Index to MSCI KLD 400 Social Index.

See also
 Calvert Social Index
 FTSE4Good Index

References

External links 

 MSCI KLD 400 Social Index Factsheet 

American stock market indices
Ethical investment stock market indices